Granta is a literary magazine and publisher in the United Kingdom whose mission centres on its "belief in the power and urgency of the story, both in fiction and non-fiction, and the story’s supreme ability to describe, illuminate and make real." In 2007, The Observer stated: "In its blend of memoirs and photojournalism, and in its championing of contemporary realist fiction, Granta has its face pressed firmly against the window, determined to witness the world."

Granta has published twenty-seven laureates of the Nobel Prize in Literature. Literature published by Granta regularly win prizes such as the Forward Prize, T. S. Eliot Prize, Pushcart Prize and more.

History

Granta was founded in 1889 by students at Cambridge University as The Granta, edited by R. C. Lehmann, (who later became a major contributor to Punch). It was started as a periodical featuring student politics, badinage and literary efforts. The title was taken from the medieval name for the Cam, the river which runs through the town, but is now used only for two of that river's tributaries. An early editor of the magazine was R. P. Keigwin, the English cricketer and Danish scholar; in 1912–13 the editor was the poet, writer and reviewer Edward Shanks.

In this form the magazine had a long and distinguished history. The magazine published juvenilia of a number of writers who later became well known: Geoffrey Gorer, William Empson, Michael Frayn, Ted Hughes, A. A. Milne, Sylvia Plath, Bertram Fletcher Robinson, John Simpson, and Stevie Smith.

Rebirth
During the 1970s the publication, faced with financial difficulties and increasing levels of student apathy, was rescued by a group of interested postgraduates, including writer and producer Jonathan Levi, journalist Bill Buford, and Peter de Bolla (now Professor of Cultural History and Aesthetics at Cambridge University). In 1979, it was successfully relaunched as a magazine of "new writing", with both writers and audience drawn from the world beyond Cambridge. Bill Buford (who wrote Among the Thugs originally as a project for the journal) was the editor for its first 16 years in the new incarnation. Ian Jack succeeded him, editing Granta from 1995 until 2007.

In April 2007, it was announced that Jason Cowley, editor of the Observer Sport Monthly, would succeed Jack as editor in September 2007. Cowley redesigned and relaunched the magazine; he also launched a new website. In September 2008, he left when he was selected as editor of the New Statesman.

Alex Clark, a former deputy literary editor of The Observer, succeeded him as the first female editor of Granta. In late May 2009, Clark left the publication and John Freeman, the American editor, took over the magazine.

, Grantas circulation was almost 50,000.

Ownership
In 1994, Rea Hederman, owner of The New York Review of Books, took a controlling stake in the magazine. In October 2005, control of the magazine was bought by Sigrid Rausing.

Granta Books

In 1989, then-editor Buford founded Granta Books. Granta's stated aim for its book publishing imprint is to publish work that "stimulates, inspires, addresses difficult questions, and examines intriguing periods of history." Owner Sigrid Rausing has been vocal about her goal to maintain these standards for both the magazine and the book imprint, telling the Financial Times, "[Granta] will not publish any books that could not potentially be extracted in the magazine. We use the magazine as a yardstick for our books.... We are no longer going to look at what sells as a sort of argument, because it seemed to me that we were in danger of losing our inventiveness about what we wanted to do." Authors recently published by Granta Books include Michael Collins, Simon Gray, Anna Funder, Tim Guest, Caspar Henderson, Louise Stern and Olga Tokarczuk.

When Rausing purchased Granta, she brought with her the publishing imprint Portobello Books. Granta Books and Portobello Books are distributed by The Book Service in the UK. Granta Books are distributed by Ingram Publisher Services in the US.

Granta Best of Young British Novelists
In 1983, Granta (issue #7) published a list of 20 young British novelists as names to watch out for in the future. Since then, the magazine has repeated its recognition of emerging writers in 1993 (issue #43), 2003 (issue #81) and 2013 (issue #123). In 1996 (issue #54), Granta published a similar list of promising young American novelists, which was repeated during 2007 (issue #97). In 2010 Granta issue #113 was devoted to the best young Spanish-language novelists. Many of the selections have been prescient. At least 12 of those identified have subsequently either won or been short-listed for major literary awards such as the Booker Prize and Whitbread Prize.

The recognition of Adam Thirlwell and Monica Ali on the 2003 list was controversial, as neither had yet published a novel. Thirlwell's debut novel, Politics, later met with mixed reviews. Ali's Brick Lane was widely praised. Those controversially excluded in 2003 included Giles Foden, Alex Garland, Niall Griffiths, Zoë Heller, Tobias Hill, Jon McGregor (who won the International Dublin Literary Award less than ten years later), Patrick Neate, Maggie O'Farrell and Rebecca Smith.

Dan Rhodes contacted others on the 2003 list to try to persuade them to make a joint statement in protest against the Iraq War, which was gaining momentum at the time. Not all the writers responded. Rhodes was so disappointed he considered stopping writing, but has continued.

1983
Martin Amis
William Boyd
Maggie Gee
Kazuo Ishiguro
Adam Mars-Jones
Salman Rushdie
Julian Barnes
Ursula Bentley
Pat Barker
Buchi Emecheta
Ian McEwan
Shiva Naipaul
Graham Swift
Rose Tremain
Clive Sinclair
Alan Judd
Philip Norman
A. N. Wilson
Christopher Priest
Lisa St Aubin de Terán

1993
Kazuo Ishiguro
Hanif Kureishi
Ben Okri
Esther Freud
Caryl Phillips
Will Self
Iain Banks
Adam Lively
Helen Simpson
Tibor Fischer
Nicholas Shakespeare
Philip Kerr
Lawrence Norfolk
Louis de Bernières
A. L. Kennedy
Alan Hollinghurst
Candia McWilliam
Anne Billson
Adam Mars-Jones
Jeanette Winterson

2003
Monica Ali
Nicola Barker
Rachel Cusk
Peter Ho Davies
Susan Elderkin
Philip Hensher
A. L. Kennedy
Hari Kunzru
Toby Litt
David Mitchell
Andrew O'Hagan
David Peace
Dan Rhodes
Ben Rice
Rachel Seiffert
Zadie Smith
Adam Thirlwell
Alan Warner
Sarah Waters
Robert McLiam Wilson

2013
 Naomi Alderman 
 Tahmima Anam 
 Ned Beauman 
 Jenni Fagan 
 Adam Foulds 
 Xiaolu Guo 
 Sarah Hall 
 Steven Hall 
 Joanna Kavenna 
 Benjamin Markovits 
 Nadifa Mohamed 
 Helen Oyeyemi 
 Ross Raisin 
 Sunjeev Sahota 
 Taiye Selasi 
 Kamila Shamsie 
 Zadie Smith 
 David Szalay
 Adam Thirlwell 
 Evie Wyld

Granta Best of Young American Novelists

1996
Sherman Alexie
Madison Smartt Bell
Ethan Canin
Edwidge Danticat
Tom Drury
Tony Earley
Jeffrey Eugenides
Jonathan Franzen
David Guterson
David Haynes
Allen Kurzweil
Elizabeth McCracken
Lorrie Moore
Fae Myenne Ng
Robert O'Connor
Chris Offutt
Stewart O'Nan
Mona Simpson
Melanie Rae Thon
Kate Wheeler
Katharine Weber

2007
Daniel Alarcón
Kevin Brockmeier
Judy Budnitz
Christopher Coake
Anthony Doerr
Jonathan Safran Foer
Nell Freudenberger
Olga Grushin
Dara Horn
Gabe Hudson
Uzodinma Iweala
Nicole Krauss
Rattawut Lapcharoensap
Yiyun Li
Maile Meloy
ZZ Packer
Jess Row
Karen Russell
Akhil Sharma
Gary Shteyngart
John Wray

2017
Jesse Ball
Halle Butler
Emma Cline
Joshua Cohen
Mark Doten
Jen George
Rachel B. Glaser
Lauren Groff
Yaa Gyasi
Garth Risk Hallberg
Greg Jackson
Sana Krasikov
Catherine Lacey
Ben Lerner
Karan Mahajan
Anthony Marra
Dinaw Mengestu
Ottessa Moshfegh
Chinelo Okparanta
Esmé Weijun Wang
Claire Vaye Watkins

Granta Best of Young Spanish Language Novelists

2010
Andrés Barba
Oliverio Coelho
Federico Falco
Pablo Gutiérrez
Rodrigo Hasbún
Sonia Hernández
Carlos Labbé
Javier Montes
Elvira Navarro
Matías Néspolo
Andrés Neuman
Alberto Olmos
Pola Oloixarac
Antonio Ortuño
Patricio Pron
Lucía Puenzo
Andrés Ressia Colino
Santiago Roncagliolo
Samanta Schweblin
Andrés Felipe Solano
Carlos Yushimito
Alejandro Zambra

2021
Andrea Abreu 
José Adiak Montoya 
David Aliaga 
Carlos Manuel Álvarez 
José Ardila 
Gonzalo Baz 
Miluska Benavides 
Martín Felipe Castagnet 
Andrea Chapela 
Camila Fabbri 
Paulina Flores 
Carlos Fonseca
Mateo García Elizondo 
Aura García-Junco 
Munir Hachemi 
Dainerys Machado Vento 
Estanislao Medina Huesca 

Alejandro Morellón 
Michel Nieva 
Mónica Ojeda 
Eudris Planche Savón 
Irene Reyes-Noguerol 
Aniela Rodríguez 
Diego Zúñiga

Granta Best of Young Brazilian Novelists

2012
 
 
 Vanessa Barbara
 Carol Bensimon
 Miguel del Castillo
 João Paulo Cuenca
 Laura Edler
 Emilio Fraia
 Julian Fuks
 Daniel Galera
 Luisa Geisler
 Vinicius Jatobá
 Michel Laub
 Ricardo Lísias
 
 
 Carola Saavedra
 Tatiana Salem Levy
 Leandro Sarmatz
 Antonio Xerxenesky

See also 

List of Granta issues

References

Further reading

External links
 Granta official website
 Granta Books official website
Finding aid to Granta records at Columbia University. Rare Book & Manuscript Library.

1889 establishments in the United Kingdom
Literary magazines published in the United Kingdom
Quarterly magazines published in the United Kingdom
Digests
Magazines published in London
Magazines established in 1889
Publications associated with the University of Cambridge